

History
The hospital was established in 1861 with the name of London Christian Church Hospital. Jin Xianzhai, the well-known oncologist, set up the first tumor ward in the hospital in 1952. In 1972, the hospital became a specialized cancer hospital with 341 beds. In 1977, the Institute of Cancer Research was established with eight departments.

Today, Tianjin Medical University Cancer Institute and Hospital is one of the largest bases for cancer prevention, treatment, training and research in China.

Cancer prevention and treatment research center
Tianjin Medical University is constructing the largest cancer prevention, treatment, and research base in Asia. On June 27, construction of the comprehensive cancer prevention and treatment research center, with a gross floor area of 93,000 square meters, started at Tianjin Medical University Cancer Institute and Hospital. Upon completion, the hospital will have 1,800 beds, be able to serve 500,000 outpatients, and perform over 20,000 surgical operations annually.

The hospital will become the largest cancer prevention, treatment and research base in Asia, incorporating fundamental oncological research, clinical treatment and high-end training.

The center plans to make a breakthrough in integrating clinical treatment and scientific research; seven clinical research centers will be constructed, with a view to realizing a "seamless interconnection" between clinical treatment and scientific research.

Hospitals in Tianjin